MLAT may refer to:

 Magnetic latitude (MLAT), or geomagnetic latitude
 Mutual legal assistance treaty (mLAT)
 Modern Language Aptitude Test (MLAT)
 Multilateration (MLat)